The 2006 Movistar Open was an ATP men's tennis tournament held on outdoor clay courts in Viña del Mar, Chile that was part of the International Series of the 2006 ATP Tour. It was the 12th edition of the tournament and was held from 30 January to 6 February 2005. Third-seeded José Acasuso won the singles title.

Finals

Singles

 José Acasuso defeated  Nicolás Massú 6–4, 6–3
 It was Acasuso's 1st singles title of the year and the 3rd and last of his career.

Doubles

 José Acasuso /  Sebastián Prieto defeated  František Čermák /  Leoš Friedl 7–6(7–2), 6–4
 It was Acasuso's 1st title of the year and the 6th of his career. It was Prieto's only title of the year and the 7th of his career.

References

External links
 ATP tournament profile

 
Chile Open (tennis)
Movistar Open
Movistar Open